Ezio Selva (20 March 1902 – 29 December 1957) was an Italian diver. He competed in the men's 10 metre platform event at the 1928 Summer Olympics. Selva was also a powerboat racer, and was killed in a race at Miami Beach.

References

External links
 

1902 births
1957 deaths
Italian male divers
Olympic divers of Italy
Divers at the 1928 Summer Olympics
People from Locarno